Houndé is a department or commune of Tuy Province in southern Burkina Faso. Its capital is the town of Houndé.

Towns and villages

References

Departments of Burkina Faso
Tuy Province